Carolina de Robertis is a Uruguayan-American author and teacher of creative writing at San Francisco State University. They are the author of five novels and the editor of an award-winning anthology, Radical Hope (2017), which include essays by such writers as Junot Diaz and Jane Smiley. They are also well known for their translational work, frequently translating Spanish pieces.

Early life 
Carolina De Robertis is the child of two Uruguayan parents. They were born in England and moved throughout their childhood, following the scientific career of their father, Edward De Robertis. De Robertis later moved to Basel (Switzerland), until finally ending up in Los Angeles, California. Aged 19, De Robertis came out as bisexual, which they have described as the beginning of the process of their parents disowning them, which was complete by the time she was 25. Describing their relationship with their parents, they said, "They actually dug in their heels and tried to turn my siblings against my first child when I was pregnant with the first child. I use that example to say, it's not true that everybody comes around."

They worked as a rape counselor and was very active in the Bay Area's LGBTQ+ community for ten years in their 20s.

De Robertis received a Bachelor of Arts degree in English literature from University of California, Los Angeles in 1996. They also received a Master of Fine Arts degree in creative writing from Mills College in 2007.

Career 
De Robertis released their first book, The Invisible Mountain, in 2009. The novel was an international best-seller, being translated into 17 languages, including Italian, Spanish, German, Dutch, French, Hebrew, and Chinese. It won best book for the San Francisco Chronicle, O, The Oprah Magazine, and Booklist. It was also a finalist for the California Book Award, an International Latino Book Award, and the VCU Cabell First Book Award.

De Robertis' 2019 novel, Cantoras, is set in 1970s Uruguay. Its five protagonists are all lesbians. The book was selected as a New York Times Editors’ Choice. It also won a Stonewall Book Award, and a Reading Women Award, as well as being a finalist for the Kirkus Prize and a Lambda Literary Award. In 2021, her novel The President and the Frog was published. The character of the President in the book is heavily influenced by José Mujica, the former President of Uruguay. Writing in The Nation, Lily Meyer said that the book, "asks its readers to think seriously about the weight of taking political action, then suggests that they take it."

In 2022, De Robertis became the 41st recipient of the Dos Passos Prize, awarded annually to an American author who American "experiments with form, explores a range of voices and deserves more recognition."

Personal life 
De Robertis lives with their wife, Pamela Harris, and their two children in Oakland, California. They identify as queer and genderqueer. Describing their sexuality on the LGBTQ&A podcast, De Robertis said, "The more words the better. So I'm a dyke, I'm a lesbian, I'm also bi. It's all good."

Works

Novels 
 The Invisible Mountain (2009)
 Perla (2012)
 The Gods of Tango  (2015)
 Cantoras (2019)
 The President and the Frog (2021)

Translation 
 "Trans: A Love Story" by Gabriela Wiener (2007)
 Bonsai by Alejandro Zambra (2008)
 "I Never Went to Blanes" by Diego Trelles Paz (2010)
 The Neruda Case by Roberto Ampuero (2012)
 "Tripych" by Raquel Lubartowski (2017)

Essays 
 "42 Poorly Kept Secrets About Montevideo" for The Indiana Review (2006)
 "Translating a Pablo Neruda Mystery" for Publishers Weekly (2012)
 "We Need the Real, Racist Atticus Finch" for the San Francisco Chronicle Book Review (2015)
 "Why We Must Listen to Women" for the Easy Bay Express (2017)

Other 
 "The Askers" for the Virginia Quarterly Review (2009)
 "On the Brink of Words" for the 580 Split (2009)
 "For Orlando" for the San Francisco Chronicle (2016)
 "The Tango Police" for CNET's Technically Literate Series (2017)
 Radical Hope (2017)

Honors and awards 
 2022: John Dos Passos Prize
 Terrific Read from O, The Oprah Magazine (2009)
 Rhegium Julii Prize (2010)
 2012 Fellowship from the National Endowment for the Arts
 San Francisco Chronicle, the Best Books of 2015
 Stonewall Book Award (2016)

References

External links 

 http://www.carolinaderobertis.com

1975 births
Living people
21st-century American novelists
American women novelists
American LGBT writers
Uruguayan women novelists
Uruguayan novelists
21st-century Uruguayan writers
American women essayists
21st-century American essayists
21st-century American women writers
Stonewall Book Award winners
21st-century LGBT people